Hanover County Courthouse is a historic courthouse located in the community of Hanover Courthouse, the county seat of Hanover County, Virginia.  Built about 1735, it is one of the nation's oldest courthouses still in use for that purpose.  It is historically notable as the site of the Parson's Cause case, which was argued by Patrick Henry in 1763.  It was designated a National Historic Landmark in 1973.  A modern courthouse complex stands nearby, which now houses most of the county's judicial functions.

Description and history
The Hanover County Courthouse is located in the center of the small community  formally called Hanover Courthouse (but is more colloquially known just as "Hanover").  It is set on a grassy quadrangle on the north side of United States Route 301, with other 18th-century buildings nearby that make up the Hanover County Courthouse Historic District.  It is a single story brick building, with a tall hipped roof with modillioned cornice, and three chimneys.  It is laid out in a T shape, with the courtroom in the rear-projecting leg of the T, the judge's quarters on the left side, and a jury room on the right.  The front of the building is distinguished by an arcade of rounded arches.

Hanover County was created in 1720 by the Colony of Virginia.  The courthouse was built about 1735, supposedly by William Meriwether, who also built and operated the original Hanover Tavern, just across the main road.  Its design was apparently based on the courthouse of King William County to the southeast.

In 1763, Patrick Henry, who lived and practiced law in Hanover County, argued the case of the Parson's Cause, involving King George III's veto of local legislation changing tax rates for the support of local Anglican ministry despite their objections and those of the House of Burgesses. Henry, representing the county, accused the King of tyranny in overturning colonial law without regard to the wishes of his subjects.

A new modern government complex with two court buildings was built and opened in 1979 adjacent to the 1735 courthouse, which is still actively used for periodic judicial proceedings to alleviate crowded court dockets and also for handling ceremonial events

See also
 Oldest courthouses in the United States
 List of National Historic Landmarks in Virginia
 National Register of Historic Places listings in Hanover County, Virginia

References

External links

Hanover County Courthouse, U.S. Route 301, Hanover, Hanover County, VA: 3 photos at Historic American Buildings Survey
 Hanover County website
 Hanover County Historic Resources website
 Map and directions to Hanover County Government Complex including historic Courthouse and current General District Court and Circuit Court buildings
 National Historic Landmarks Program listing for Hanover County Courthouse

National Historic Landmarks in Virginia
County courthouses in Virginia
Courthouse
Government buildings completed in 1735
Georgian architecture in Virginia
Courthouses on the National Register of Historic Places in Virginia
Courthouse
Historic American Buildings Survey in Virginia
Individually listed contributing properties to historic districts on the National Register in Virginia
Patrick Henry